The Oklahoma Department of Veteran Affairs (ODVA) is a department of the state of Oklahoma under the supervision of the Oklahoma Secretary of Veterans Affairs charged with providing medical and rehabilitative services for veterans and their families.

The Department is governed by a nine-member Oklahoma Veterans Commission, who members are appointed by the Governor, with the approval the Oklahoma Senate for three-year terms. The Governor appoints members from names submitted by the American Legion, Disabled American Veterans, Veterans of Foreign Wars, Military Order of the Purple Heart, National Guard Association, Paralyzed Veterans of America, as well as three at-large appointees. The Commission in turn appoints the Executive Director of the Department, who serves at the pleasure of the Commission and is responsible for administration of the Department.

The Department was created in 1981 during the term of Governor George Nigh as a successor to the Soldiers Relief Commission.

Mission and History
The Oklahoma Department of Veterans Affairs provides resources and services to military veterans residing in the state of Oklahoma.  This includes assistance with state and federal benefits, disability claims, burial and survivor benefits, healthcare, employment, education, mental health/suicide prevention, entrepreneurship, veteran-owned businesses, women veteran services and veterans in agriculture. ODVA also operates seven long-term care facilities for veterans throughout Oklahoma. These services include nursing and domiciliary care, financial assistance in emergencies, and field service counseling in the filing of claims for United States Department of Veterans Affairs and state benefits.

The Oklahoma Legislature created the Soldiers Relief Commission in 1947. It was later replaced by the Department in 1981.

Leadership
The Department is administered by the Department's Executive Director. Oversight for the Department is provided by the nine member Oklahoma Veterans Commission.

Oklahoma Veterans Commission
The Department of Veterans Affairs is administered under such rules, regulations and policies as may be prescribed by the nine-member Oklahoma Veterans Commission. The members of the Commission are appointed by the Governor of Oklahoma, with the approval of the Oklahoma Senate, from a list of names submitted by the American Legion, Disabled American Veterans, Veterans of Foreign Wars, Military Order of the Purple Heart, National Guard Association, Paralyzed Veterans of America, as well as three at-large appointees. One member of the Commission must be Vietnam War veteran and two shall be veterans of the Persian Gulf Wars.  All members serve three-year terms.

As of March 2023, the members of the Oklahoma Veterans Commission are as follows:
Chairman Robert Allen
Vice Chairman Dr. Sidney Ellington
Secretary Heather McEver
Brett Martin
Kevin Offel
Daniel Orr
Ted Perry
Military Order of the Purple Heart, Vacancy
Paralyzed Veterans of America, Vacancy

Budget

Funding
The Department is funded primarily from three sources: yearly appropriations, patient fees, and federal funding. The United States Department of Veterans Affairs provides the Department a federal per diem payment per veteran in each Department Veterans Center. Each of the three funding sources makes up roughly one-third of the total budget of the Department.

Expenditures
The Department has annual budget of just over $130 million. The vast majority of that budget (over $100 million) was dedicated to employee salaries and benefits.

Organization
Oklahoma Veterans Commission
Executive Director, Greg Slavonic
Deputy Director
Director of Homes, Shawn Kirkland
Chief Financial Officer, Lisa White
Claims and Benefits Director, Randy Law 
Lawton Team
Muskogee Team
Central Oklahoma Team
Northwest Oklahoma Team
Northeast Oklahoma Team
Southeast Oklahoma Team
Oklahoma State Veterans Home Team
Construction Programs Administrator, Nisha Young
Regional Veterans Home Administrators 
Ardmore Veterans Home, Amy Sprouse
Claremore Veterans Home, Carole Kimbrough
Clinton Veterans Home, Stephanie Taylor
Lawton Veterans Home, Charles Gladney
Norman Veterans Home, Mike Russell
Sulphur Veterans Home, Jeff Livingston
Talihina Veterans Home (Soon to be Sallisaw Veterans Home), Sarah Breshears
Human Resources Director, Jennifer Shockley
State Approving Agency Administrator, Dr. Brint Montgomery
Veterans Home Outreach, Rob Arrington
Women Veterans Coordinator, Lisa Mussett
Veteran Owned Businesses, Daron Hoggatt
Fleet Programs Administrator, Cherri Higgs
Mental Health & Suicide Prevention, Aaron Ashworth

Claims and Benefits
The Claims and Benefits Division provides many different services to the veterans and their dependents. The primary function is to assist veterans and their dependents with their claims before the United States Department of Veterans Affairs. Claims worked through the Muskogee, Oklahoma Claims Office help claimants obtain compensation and pension benefits. Oklahoma Department of Veterans Affairs Service Officers are nationally accredited through the Department of Veterans Affairs to represent the claimant with their claims and appeals. The Service Officers will assist in the appeals process, and if necessary, represent the claimant at a personal hearing before the United States Department of Veterans Affairs Hearing Officer. The Muskogee Claims Office handles lifetime hunting & fishing permits, state benefits requests, and the Financial Assistance Program.

Staffing
The Veterans Affairs Department, with an annual budget of over $130 million, is one of the largest employers of the State. For fiscal year 2010, the Department was authorized 1,998 full-time employees.

See also
United States Department of Veterans Affairs

References

External links
Oklahoma Department of Veterans Affairs official website

Veterans Affairs, Department of
Oklahoma